Symmoriidae is an extinct family of holocephalians from the Devonian and Carboniferous periods.

References

Devonian first appearances
Symmoriiformes
Prehistoric cartilaginous fish families